Duvalius is a genus of beetles in the family Carabidae. They are distributed from the Mediterranean area to northwestern China. They typically live in caves and in shallow subterranean spaces. Many species are rare and have very restricted distributions.

Species
The genus includes the following species:

References

Trechinae
Carabidae genera